Don Whitten (16 September 1935 – 28 December 2021) was an Australian rules footballer who played with Footscray in the Victorian Football League (VFL).

Whitten, who played for Footscray in the under-19s, joined his brother Ted in the senior team in 1956. He played 24 games over three seasons with Footscray, often as a centreman, then in 1959 joined Western District Football League club Casterton as coach.

He coached Casterton to a premiership in 1960, but was then replaced in the role by two-time Essendon best and fairest winner, Reg Burgess.

Instead, Whitten played for Yarraville in 1961 and was a member of their premiership side that year. He captained the club in 1963, a year in which he finished second in the J. J. Liston Trophy, to teammate Ron Clegg.

From 1964 to 1968, Whitten was coach of Tocumwal in the Murray Football League. During his tenure, Tocumwal made three consecutive grand finals and won the premiership in 1967.

Whitten died on 28 December 2021, at the age of 86.

References

1935 births
2021 deaths
Australian rules footballers from Victoria (Australia)
Braybrook Football Club players
Casterton Football Club players
Western Bulldogs players
Yarraville Football Club players